Forestville Mystery Cave State Park is a state park in Minnesota. It contains the village of Forestville, which has been restored to a 19th-century appearance. The Minnesota Historical Society operates it as a historic site. Below ground the park contains Mystery Cave, the state's longest cave, which is open to the public. The park is between Spring Valley and Preston, Minnesota.

Mystery Cave
The park is in the Driftless Area, noted for its karst topography, which includes sinkholes and caves. The cave includes stalactites, stalagmites, and underground pools, and is a constant .

Geologic history
About 450 million years ago sedimentary rocks were deposited as the land was intermittently covered by shallow seas that transgressed and regressed. Over the eons the alternating deposits of mud and oceanic debris were compressed to form limestone, shale and sandstone layers. Within the last 500,000 to 1,000,000 years, flood waters dissolved along fractures in the limestone bedrock to create most of the cave. Acidic rainwater also sculpted the land above and around the cave, creating thousands of sinkholes and other karst features in the surrounding county.

Wildlife
The park contains a range of wildlife, from relatively rare species such as glacial snails and timber rattlesnakes to common species such as deer, raccoon, beaver, two species of fox, mink, opossum, woodchuck, and four species of squirrels. Coyotes howl at dusk. Numerous reptiles and amphibians are present. At least 175 species of birds have also been recorded. The South Branch of the Root River contains brown trout, brook trout, and rainbow trout.

Historic Forestville
The Minnesota Historical Society operates Historic Forestville as a living museum set in 1899. Costumed interpreters portray Forestville residents and go about daily activities in the general store, house, kitchen, farm, and barn.

Forestville was a rural trade center in the 1800s that declined after the railroad was built elsewhere in 1868. Thomas Meighen, son of one of the town's founders, owned the entire village by 1890, including the general store, and the local residents worked on his property for housing and credit in the store.

Admission to Historic Forestville is separate from the caves. Historic Forestville is open from May through October.

References

External links

 Forestville/Mystery Cave State Park
 Minnesota Historical Society: Historic Forestville

1941 establishments in Minnesota
Caves of Minnesota
Driftless Area
Landforms of Fillmore County, Minnesota
Living museums in Minnesota
Minnesota Historical Society
Minnesota state historic sites
Museums in Fillmore County, Minnesota
Protected areas established in 1941
Protected areas of Fillmore County, Minnesota
Show caves in the United States
State parks of Minnesota
Historic districts on the National Register of Historic Places in Minnesota
National Register of Historic Places in Fillmore County, Minnesota